David Clarence Gibboney (1868-1920) was the secretary of the Law and Order Society in Philadelphia in the United States since 1890. He was described by Rudolph Blankenburg as one of the leading men in the city and responsible for the arrest of thousands of brothel-keepers, "white slavers", and people breaking gambling and liquor laws.

References

External links
http://worldcat.org/identities/np-gibboney,%20d%20clarence/

1868 births
1920 deaths
American temperance activists
People from Philadelphia